Madeline Anello-Kitzmiller (born 1997) is an American woman noted for her response to being assaulted at Rhythm and Vines in New Zealand on December 31, 2017. Anello-Kitzmiller attracted both praise and criticism for her behavior following being assaulted.

Background 
Anello-Kitzmiller, from Portland, was attending Rhythm and Vines on December 31, 2017. She was topless, having paid to have her breasts painted with glitter at a 'glitter tits' stall at the festival. While walking through the venue, a man came up behind her and a friend and groped one of her decorated breasts. The man then retreated to where he was sitting nearby with friends. Enraged, Anello-Kitzmiller and her friend turned and approached the man. Her friend poured a drink on him, and Anello-Kitzmiller hit him four times. Anello-Kitzmiller indicated that she had previously been abused by others at the festival, and her response was partly due to her pent up anger. After attacking the man, Anello-Kitzmiller kept her breasts exposed until the following morning.

Praise 
Some writers, such as Suzannah Weiss, noted that sexual assaults at events like Rhythm and Vines have been too common. Weiss praised Anello-Kitzmiller as a feminist hero for her actions.

Aftermath 
On 28 January 2018, a march was held in Auckland to promote requiring consent and to show solidarity with Anello-Kitzmiller. Some of the women in the march went topless wearing glitter similar to how Anello-Kitzmiller was dressed at the original event.

References 

1997 births
Living people
Naturism in New Zealand
People from Portland, Oregon